This is a list of awards and nominations received by American actress Jennifer Garner.

Major associations

Golden Globe Awards

Primetime Emmy Awards

Screen Actors Guild Awards

Other awards and nominations

Critics' Choice Movie Awards

MTV Movie & TV Awards

Nickelodeon Kids' Choice Awards

Online Film Critics Society

People's Choice Awards

Satellite Awards

Saturn Awards

ShoWest Awards

TCA Awards

Teen Choice Awards

Hasty Pudding Theatrical Awards

References

External links
 

Garner, Jennifer